The 156th Regiment Illinois Volunteer Infantry was an infantry regiment that served in the Union Army during the American Civil War.

Service
The 156th Illinois Infantry was mustered into Federal service on February 16, 1865.

The regiment was mustered out on September 20, 1865.

Total strength and casualties
The regiment suffered 2 enlisted men killed in action or mortally wounded and 24 enlisted men who died of disease, for a total of 26 fatalities.

Commanders
Colonel Alfred T. Smith - discharged with the regiment

See also
List of Illinois Civil War Units
Illinois in the American Civil War

Notes

References
The Civil War Archive

Units and formations of the Union Army from Illinois
1865 establishments in Illinois
Military units and formations established in 1865
Military units and formations disestablished in 1865